Pakistan-Ukraine relations are foreign relations between Pakistan and Ukraine. Pakistan recognized Ukraine's independence in 1991. Diplomatic relations between both countries were established 1992. However, Pakistan and Ukraine relations were first established before the Ukrainian independence from Soviet Union. Since 2018, Pakistan-Ukraine relations moving from Conventional Diplomacy to Public Diplomacy. In recent years, Pakistan had developed close economic and military ties with Ukraine.

Pakistan has an embassy in Kyiv. Ukraine has an embassy in Islamabad and honorary consulates in Karachi and Lahore. Ukraine and Pakistan have been cooperating with each other in educational sectors as well as cultural exchanges. Pakistan and Ukraine also heavily cooperate with each other in aerospace engineering, aerospace technologies, bio-medical sciences and science and technology.

In 2021, the bilateral trade turnover was US$411.814 million.

Bilateral trade
The bilateral trade between the two countries started on 16 March 1992. In 2021, the volume of Pakistan-Ukraine trade turnover had reached US$411.814 million.

Pakistan is also a major importer of Ukrainian wheat.

Military ties
In the late 1990s, Ukraine sold Pakistan 320 Ukrainian T-80UD main battle tanks in a deal worth US$650 million. According to Kyiv Post, the deal literally saved Kharkiv Malyshev Tank Factory from bankruptcy.

According to Stockholm International Peace Research Institute (SIPRI) databases, from 1991 to 2020, Ukraine completed arms contracts with Pakistan with a total value of nearly US$1.6 billion. During that period, Pakistan was described as Ukraine's biggest arms customer right next to Russia, China, India, and Thailand.

In December 2008, Pakistan signed an agreement with Ukraine to purchase four Il-78 refueling aircraft outfitted with Russian-designed UPAZ refueling pods. All of the purchased aircraft were delivered by 2012.

In June 2020, Ukrspetsexport and Pakistani officials signed a multimillion dollar contract to upgrade one of Pakistan Air Force's Il-78 aerial refueling tanker aircraft. The aircraft was modernised by Ukroboronprom’s Nikolaev Aircraft Repair Plant and was delivered back to Pakistan by 4 February 2022. Ukrspetsexport called this event an important stage of cooperation with Pakistani partners.

In February 2021, UkrOboronProm signed a contract worth US$85.6 million with Pakistani officials to repair T-80UD main battle tanks of the Pakistan army. The newly signed contract was also a sign of relief for Malyshev Factory as the enterprise was suffering from debt worth US$67 million since the start of the year 2021.

2022 Russo-Ukrainian war
Pakistan sent humanitarian aid to help the people of Ukraine affected by Russia's invasion of Ukraine in 2022. Pakistan Air Force C-130 Hercules aircraft were flown to Poland where the aid was dispatched to help Ukrainian civilians.

Pakistan supports Ukraine's sovereignty and territorial integrity. Pakistan has also been largely consistent in abstaining on UN resolutions on Russia, and has avoided criticising Moscow. Throughout the war, Pakistan adopted a neutral stance and avoided taking sides of any of the parties involved in the conflict. Pakistan has also stressed that negotiations are the only way through which Ukraine-Russia conflict can be resolved.

During the war, the United Kingdom purchased an unspecified number of 122mm howitzer projectiles from Pakistan, which were later supplied by the United Kingdom to Ukraine. Later on, M107 155-mm projectiles along with M4A2 propellant charges manufactured by Pakistan Ordnance Factories were also spotted being used by the armed forces of Ukraine on the front lines. Experts note that it is very likely that one of Ukraine's Nato allies may have purchased ammunition from Pakistan and supplied it to Ukraine.

The Economic Times, an Indian newspaper, reported that Pakistan was reportedly planning to dispatch 159 containers of ammunition in early half of January, out of which 146 containers of ammunition were delivered by the later half of same month. The containers contained 155-mm projectiles, M4A2 propelling bag charges, M82 primers and PDM fuses, and were transferred to Ukraine through a port in Poland. The newspaper later also reported that Pakistan had supplied more than 10,000 missiles for the BM-21 Grad MLRS of armed forces of Ukraine in February 2022. BW Businessworld, an Indian magazine, reported that DMI Associates, an agent for Pakistan Ordnance Factories, has signed an MoU with the Government Strategic Reserves Agency of Poland with Polish firm PHU Lechmar LLC acting as an intermediary purchaser, and Tradent Global Solutions, based in Canada, acting as an intermediary consultant. The magazine also reports that Pakistan is in the process of exporting Anza Mark-II to Poland for transport to Ukraine and Millennium Technologies of Karachi and Omida Sea and Air of Poland are negotiating the transportation agreement. On 6 March 2023, the magazine reported that Pakistan had reportedly shipped 162 containers with ammunition, including artillery rockets, through a port in Germany to Ukraine. The magazine also reported that UK’s ministry of defence signed a pact with Pakistan Ordinance Factories recently to supply ammunition to Ukraine.

Dr. Riina Kionka, European Union's ambassador to Pakistan, in an interview with local media in Pakistan on 21 February 2023 said that Pakistan has been helping Ukraine in its protracted conflict with Russia by sending military and humanitarian aid.

However Pakistan has formally denied reports of arms supply to Ukraine, calling that claim into question.

See also
Pakistanis in Ukraine
Foreign relations of Pakistan
Foreign relations of Ukraine
Al-Khalid MBT - A Pakistani Tank with Ukrainian equipment
List of foreign aid to Ukraine during the Russo-Ukrainian War

References

External links
Pakistani embassy in Kyiv
Ukrainian embassy in Islamabad

Further reading
[

 

 
Ukraine

Bilateral relations of Ukraine